This is the discography of Dutch novelty pop group Stars on 45, also known as Starsound in the UK and Stars On in the US.

Albums

Studio albums

Compilation albums

Video albums

Singles

References

External links

Discographies of Dutch artists
Pop music group discographies